Thyridiphora is a genus of moths of the family Crambidae.

Species
Thyridiphora furia Swinhoe, 1884
Thyridiphora gilva (Turner, 1926)

References

Natural History Museum Lepidoptera genus database

Cybalomiinae
Crambidae genera
Taxa named by William Warren (entomologist)